Arena is an extinct town in Burleigh County, North Dakota, United States. The GNIS classifies it as a populated place.

Arena was founded in January 1906 and never had a population of more than 150. It withered during the Great Depression, and, as of 2018, all that remained was St. John's Lutheran Church, an old wooden school house moved to the town in the 1970s for voting, multiple abandoned homes, a railcar, and several outbuildings. A post office called Arena was established in 1906, and remained in operation along with a general store until 1996 when the building was robbed and torched by vandals. Burnt remains of the store can still be found while exploring the area where the building stood, now occupied by a house on blocks which was moved to the town in mid 2016. This house actually fueled some speculation, people believing that whoever owned it would move in, being the first person to live in Arena for almost 35 years. However, this was proved false a year later when a visitor found the town still completely abandoned, no signs of anyone planning to live there (no utilities, uncut grass). In the late 1990s, early 2000s the school was razed by George Pehl, the reason is said to be because the building was a "hazard", photo comparisons seem almost like someone was scavenging bricks from the building before it was razed. When this was told to the county school district, all they said was "Thanks!" Arena was named to note its location in a shallow valley surrounded by hills – a natural arena. Postcards from approximately 1924 show several businesses such as a hardware store, farmer's store, general merchandising, and a pool hall. It is also noted that at one time there were five cream buying stations and a large grain elevator here, which is still located at the townsite.

References 

Geography of Burleigh County, North Dakota
Ghost towns in North Dakota
Populated places established in 1906
1906 establishments in North Dakota